Charlotte Malterre-Barthes (born 1977) is a French architect and urban designer. She is an assistant professor at Harvard University Graduate School of Design.

Early life and education
Malterre-Barthes attended École nationale supérieure d'architecture de Marseille-Luminy and ETHZ, where she received her Ph.D. on the political economy of commodities, nominated for the silver medal. She worked for architecture firms Coop Himmelblau, Rudy Ricciotti and B. V. Doshi.

Career
After graduating, Malterre worked in several offices before opening her own urban design agency in Zurich with Noboru Kawagishi called OMNIBUS. In 2011, she joined the ETHZ as a research assistant and became the director of the MAS program in Urban Design. She was a research fellow at the Future Cities Laboratory at NUS in 2012.

As a faculty member at ETHZ, Malterre was a founding member of the Parity Group, an activist association dedicated to equity in architecture.
In 2019, Malterre was appointed co-curator of the International Architecture Biennale of São Paulo. In 2020, Malterre joined the faculty at Harvard University Graduate School of Design as an assistant professor. 
During this time and together with office B+, she initiated the call for "A Global Moratorium on New Construction". This was also published as an online graphic novel with Zosia Dzierżawska in the Architectural Review.

Books
 Eileen Gray: A House Under the Sun. London: Nobrow, 2019. . With Zosia Dzierżawska. 
 Some Haunted Spaces in Singapore. Zurich: Editions Patrick Frey, 2018. with M. Jaeggi.
 Cairo Desert Cities. Berlin: Ruby Press, 2017  with M. Angelil 
 Housing Cairo – The Informal Response. Berlin: Ruby Press, 2016  with M. Angelil 
 Migrant Marseille: Architecture of Social Segregation and Urban Inclusivity. Berlin: Ruby Press, 2020,  with M. Angelil

References

1977 births
Living people
Harvard Graduate School of Design faculty
French women architects
20th-century French architects
20th-century French women
French women academics
21st-century French women